Akzhaik is a district of West Kazakhstan Region in western Kazakhstan. The administrative center of the district is the selo of Chapaev. Population:   

As of 2005 the district had an area of 45,500 km2.

Geography
Akzhaik District lies in the Caspian Depression. The Ural, Bagyrlai (Бағырлай), Kushum (Көшім), Uil, and Olenti rivers flow across the territory of the district.

References

Districts of Kazakhstan
West Kazakhstan Region